The Kipeto Wind Power Station, also Kajiado Wind Power Project, is a  wind-powered electricity power station in Kenya. It is the second-largest wind farm in the country, behind the 310 megawatts Lake Turkana Wind Power Station.

Location 
The geographical coordinates of Kipeto Wind Farm are 01°43'09.0"S, 36°41'40.0"E (Latitude:-1.719167; Longitude:36.694444).

Overview 
The power station was originally owned by a consortium of investors, financiers and interest groups, including the International Finance Corporation. In July 2015, Kipeto Energy Limited, the owner/operator of the power station, signed a renewable 20 year power purchase agreement with Kenya Power, the national electricity distributor and retailer. In December 2018, Actis Capital of the United Kingdom, acquired majority shareholding in the special purpose vehicle company, for an undisclosed sum.

The power station comprises 60 General Electric turbines, each rated at 1.7 megawatts. The wind farm, which sits on  received insurance coverage from African Trade Insurance Agency (ATI), covering the owner against late payments or no payments for energy supplied.

Ownership 
Kipeto Energy Limited (KEL) is the special purpose vehicle created by the consortium of shareholders, to construct, operate and manage the power station. The shareholding in KEL, before December 2018, was as depicted in this reference. As of December 2018, the shareholding in Kipeto Energy Limited is as illustrated in the table below.

Construction and financing 
In January 2016, KEL contracted the Chinese company "China Machinery Engineering Corporation" to perform engineering design, procurement and construction (EPC) of the wind farm. The Overseas Private Investment Corporation (OPIC) has committed to lend $233 million (Sh24 billion) towards this project. The American conglomerate General Electric Wind Energy, was contracted in December 2018 to supply 60 GE 1.7-103 wind turbines for the power station. In August 2018, the Kipeto Wind Energy Company, represented by Kenneth Namunje and Overseas Private Investment Corporation, represented by Ray Washburne, signed a definitive loan agreement for US$237, from OPIC to Kipeto Energy for the construction of this power station. The ceremony, that took place in Washington DC on 27 August 2017, was witnessed by Uhuru Kenyatta, the president of Kenya and Wilbur Ross, the United States secretary of commerce.

Commercial operations
The power station began commercial operations in July 2021. The energy generated is purchased by Kenya Power and Lighting Company, under a 20-year power purchase agreement. The power is evacuated from the wind farm via a 220kV transmission line to a substation at Isinya, where it enters the national electricity grid. The total cost of this development is reported to be US$344 million. OPIC lent US$233 million and BTE Renewables, raised the remaining US$111 million.

See also 

List of power stations in Kenya
List of power stations in Africa 
List of power stations 
Energy in Kenya

References

External links 
 Website of Kipeto Energy Limited

Wind farms in Kenya
Kajiado County
Energy infrastructure completed in 2021
2021 establishments in Kenya